Wall of Fire may refer to:

 Wall of Fire (album), the second solo album by Peter Elkas
 "Wall of Fire" (song), a song by The Kinks
 Wall of Fire (mountain), a 700 m cliff face of vertically displaced quartzite in the Swartberg mountain range in South Africa
 Romance of the Three Kingdoms IV: Wall of Fire, the fourth game in Koei's Romance of the Three Kingdoms series
 The Wall of Fire, also known as Incident II, the traumatic memories associated with the ruler Xenu in Scientology

See also

 Firewall (disambiguation)
 Wall Fire, a 2017 wildfire near Bangor, Eastern Butte County, California
 Ring of Fire (disambiguation)